Jean-Jacques Duval d'Eprémesnil (5 December 174522 April 1794), French magistrate and politician, was born in India at Pondicherry, his father being a colleague of Joseph François Dupleix.

He showed bitter enmity to Marie Antoinette in the matter of the diamond necklace, and on 19 November 1787 he was the spokesman of the parlement in demanding the convocation of the states-general.

When the court retaliated by an edict depriving the parlement of its functions, Eprémesnil bribed the printers to supply him with a copy before its promulgation, and this he read to the assembled .

After four months imprisonment on the island of Ste Marguerite, Eprémesnil found himself a popular hero, and was returned to the states-general as deputy of the nobility of the outlying districts of Paris. But with the rapid advance towards revolution his views changed; in his Réflexions impartiales ... (January 1789) he defended the monarchy, and he led the party among the nobility that refused to meet with the third estate until summoned to do so by royal command.

In the Constituent Assembly he opposed every step towards the destruction of the monarchy. After a narrow escape from the fury of the Parisian populace in July 1792 he was imprisoned in the Abbey of Saint-Germain-des-Prés, but was set at liberty before the September Massacres. In September 1793, however, he was arrested at Le Havre, taken to Paris, and denounced to the Convention as an agent of Pitt. He was brought to trial before the revolutionary tribunal on 21 April 1794, and was guillotined the next day.

D'Eprémesnil's speeches were collected in a small volume in 1823. See also Henri Carré, Un Précurseur inconscient de la Révolution (Paris, 1897).

References

External links

1745 births
1794 deaths
French people executed by guillotine during the French Revolution
People from Puducherry district
Executed Indian people